LeAnna M. Gutierrez Cumber (born February 3, 1973) is an American politician, lawyer and former teacher serving as a member of the Jacksonville City Council in Florida. Cumber previously served as a legislative counselor for the Office of Inspector General for the Department of Transportation during the Presidency of George W. Bush.

Early life and education 
Cumber was raised in Ann Arbor, Michigan. While still in high school, she focused on issues involving rape and domestic violence.

She attended the University of Texas at Austin where she earned her Bachelor of Arts degree in government, moved to Nacogdoches, Texas and worked at a shelter for battered women. She later procured a position with the Nacogdoches Independent School District as a third-grade bilingual teacher. She also taught school for two years in rural east Texas, and then moved to Los Angeles and procured a position with the Los Angeles Unified School District as a fifth-grade bilingual teacher.

In 2001, Cumber received her Juris Doctor degree from the USC Gould School of Law.  While in law school, she worked with prisoners in the California Institute for Women, and federal maximum and minimum security facilities. She represented clients in civil matters ranging from child custody to parole hearings.

Cumber's husband Husein is the Chief Strategy Officer for Florida East Coast Industries, LLC. (FECI). FECI is one of Florida's largest commercial real estate, transportation and infrastructure companies and Husein has lobbied on their behalf.

Career 
After graduation from law school, Cumber went to work for the California Women’s Law Center where she advocated for policy changes in domestic violence and family law before moving to Washington D.C. in 2002 where she began a career focused on transportation and homeland security policy.  She is a member of the bar in both Washington, D.C. and California.

Cumber began her legal career as a staffer in the United States Senate, and for the Office of the Inspector General (U.S. Department of Transportation). She also worked for Baker Botts LLP prior to starting a business of her own.

Since 2010, Cumber has been the CEO of LeAnna Cumber & Associates, a transportation-consulting firm that provides assistance to private transportation companies and state and local governments in securing public grants and financing.

City legislation 
LeAnna was elected to the Jacksonville City Council, representing District 5, in January 2019 with no opposition and assumed office on July 1, 2019. Her current term ends in June 2023. She serves as Vice-Chair of the Finance Committee and a member of the Transportation, Energy & Utilities Committee.

Cumber sponsored a city ordinance to prevent human trafficking in Jacksonville. City leaders believe their city is a center for human trafficking as a result of its location. The ordinance requires all adult entertainment performers to be at least 21 years old and have a specific Performer Work ID. It also strongly encourages hotels and motels to post Human Trafficking Awareness information in every room. It created a sex trafficking survivors commission to advise the city on ways to eradicate sex trafficking in Jacksonville.

In September 2019, in response to rising levels of crime in and around the City’s internet cafes, Cumber presented legislation calling for all simulated gambling devices to be declared illegal immediately. The bill passed in October 2019.  Protestors took to the streets in San Marco carrying signs and calling for Curry "to reverse his decision on adult arcade closures". They also demanded the resignation of Councilwoman Cumber.  One protestor called it "political corruption with special interests" and that it was "a direct attack on minority workers."

Cumber also sponsored a bill to create a pilot program establishing a permitting process for dockless mobility vehicles, such as electric bicycles and scooters.

2023 Mayoral Campaign

In March 2022, Cumber announced a formal run for Mayor of Jacksonville in 2023, after incumbent Lenny Curry's term expires.

References 

21st-century American women politicians
Jacksonville, Florida City Council members
University of Texas at Austin alumni
USC Gould School of Law alumni
1973 births
Living people
20th-century American educators
Schoolteachers from Texas
Schoolteachers from California
21st-century American lawyers
Lawyers from Cleveland
California lawyers
People from Ann Arbor, Michigan
Lawyers from Washington, D.C.
American transportation businesspeople
21st-century American politicians
20th-century American women educators
People associated with Baker Botts
Women city councillors in Florida